is a 2011 role-playing video game developed by Idea Factory and Compile Heart, with assistance from Nippon Ichi Software, Gust Corporation, 5pb., and the recently founded company Comcept by Keiji Inafune. It is the sequel to the previous game named Hyperdimension Neptunia, announced on April 12, 2011 for the PlayStation 3, as the second installment in the Hyperdimension Neptunia franchise, and is followed by Hyperdimension Neptunia Victory. It was released on August 18, 2011 in Japan, and was released in February 2012 in the United States and Europe. This is the first and so far only game in the series to receive a Mature rating from the ESRB in North America. The sequel contains both new and returning characters, and the gameplay has been updated so as to remove the random encounter feature. New maps and a brand new world feature as well, and the cutscenes have been upgraded from the old 2D visual novel style cutscenes. Hyperdimension Neptunia mk2 was made available as a downloadable title on the PlayStation Network in August 2012.

A portable remaster titled Hyperdimension Neptunia Re;Birth2: Sisters Generation for the PlayStation Vita was announced by Idea Factory and Compile Heart during a streamed interview at Tokyo Game Show 2013. It was released on 20 March 2014 in Japan, and in January 2015 in North America and Europe. Re;Birth2 was released for PC on May 29, 2015.

Gameplay

Dungeon gameplay
While in a dungeon, various actions can be performed, mainly the Treasure Search and the Symbol Attack. When the O button is pressed, the player scans the area to find hidden treasure. Enemies now wander the map, and when the player character comes within their sight range, a red exclamation point will appear (a play on Metal Gear Solid), and they will chase the player. Hitting it with a Symbol Attack gives the player's party the upper hand, and may sometimes even defeat the enemy. If the latter occurs, no rewards are gained. Likewise, if the player character is approached from behind, the battle will start with a Back Attack and the enemy will gain the advantage. Other items within dungeons include Sharicite Symbols that trigger events, Save Points, Common Items, Gathering Points that release ingredients for item synthesis, and a dungeon exit.

Battle gameplay
When the player comes in contact with an enemy on the field or during an event, battle starts. Each character's turn is gauged by their AP, or Action Points. Normal attacks and items consume AP until the points run out, after which the character's turn ends.

Each character is also assigned SP, or Skill Points, for performing skills or activating HDD (Hard Drive Divinity) in the case of the CPUs (Console Patron Units, the goddesses) or the CPU Candidates. Skills vary in range, effect, and attack power. One skill can be used per turn, after which the character's turn ends, regardless of current AP remaining. HDD requires 100 SP to activate. This is done by using the HDD ON command, and once activated, the character will regularly consume SP until it runs out, after which the character will revert. Up to 100 SP can also be carried in between battles.

Movement is gauged by a blue circle around the character. This marks the area within which the controlled character may move. Certain normal moves may shorten this circle, limiting further movement. The turn order of the battle is controlled with the Agility stat. The higher a character's Agility, the sooner their turn will come.

The command menu is used for performing various actions. The character may perform normal attacks, use skills, activate HDD (only CPUs and CPU Candidates), or end their turn. They may also switch between standby characters using AP and SP, escape from unscripted battles (dependent on Luck stat), or use items.

As in the first game, draining an enemy's GP, or Guard Points, forces that target into Guard Break mode. In this state, the defense stat and resistances of the target are significantly reduced until the enemy's GP completely recovers. GP depletes faster when a Break attack is used.

Normal combos can be edited by inserting extra commands. These commands appear after the first normal attack. Normal combos branch off into three types: Rush, Heavy Hits, and Break. Rush attacks usually involve high hit counts. Heavy Hits usually deplete enemy HP faster. Break attacks usually deplete enemy GP faster. By executing certain commands in specific patterns and consuming a set amount of AP, a combo finisher called an EX Finish is performed. The type of EX Finish is usually related to the command used to execute it.

Status conditions can affect combat. Whenever a target is affected by Poison, they continuously receive 1/16th of their max health in damage. Likewise, Heal continuously recovers 1/16th of their max health instead. When affected by Skillseal, Skills are disabled. When affected by Paralysis, the character is immobile and their turn is skipped. When a CPU or CPU Candidate is affected by Virus, the HDD ON command becomes locked, and if the target is in HDD, they forcibly revert.

Other elements
The Chirper (a play on Twitter) serves as the main communication system in each landmass. This allows the player to view what the NPCs in that landmass are talking about. NPCs with chat bubbles highlighted in purple indicate events.

When the player visits the Guild located in each landmass, they may accept quests. The quest types range between defeating a certain number of enemies to collecting a certain number of items. Once a quest is completed and reported, the player receives rewards denoted by the posted quest, and the CPU Shares for that city are altered.

Item synthesis can take place in every landmass. Once the recipe for a certain item is obtained, the player may craft that item in the synthesis shop by consuming the required ingredients that a recipe calls for. In some cases, to synthesize an item, a specific character's Lily Rank must be high enough to begin synthesis.

Shops may be used to purchase items. The inventory of a shop will increase over time as the game progresses further into the story. Shops sell a variety of items from armor to equipment to synthesis items. Items may be purchased using Credits, which are gained by certain events and winning battles.

The Lily Rank allows the player to check each character's affection level for Nepgear. Increasing Lily Rank is important, as it enables certain items to be synthesized, and in many cases, determines the ending (or endings) you receive at the end of the game. The Lily Rank system also causes certain events to occur based on a character's Lily Rank. Lily Rank may also be increased simply by viewing certain events.

Nepgear's HDD outfit can be edited with the Costume Canvas. By uploading pictures from the PS3 hard drive to the game, her outfit can be modified based on the template uploaded.

Plot

Story
The year is 20XX, and in an alternate universe from the first game, where Arfoire is dead, a force known as ASIC (Arfoire Syndicate of International Crime), a group solely dedicated towards the deceased Arfoire, has risen, led by CFW Magic. Over the years, the influence of ASIC has become increasingly powerful, currently affecting many residents of Gamindustri. As such, in response to the threat, the CPUs and Nepgear travel to the Gamindustri Graveyard to combat ASIC. However, the five of them are overpowered and captured. Three years later, IF and Compa arrive to find Neptune. With the power of the Sharicite, a crystal made from the hopes of people, the two manage to free Nepgear and escape, though the Sharicite is broken in the process. Retreating to Planeptune, Nepgear must recover her strength and free Gamindustri from the influence of ASIC, though she must first locate the mascots of the landmasses, who can provide the power to potentially assist the captive CPUs.

As she travels Gamindustri to find the mascots, she crosses paths with Nisa, Gust, 5pb, Cave, and Falcom, as well as the other CPU Candidates, who she befriends. They eventually join Nepgear's party, and together with the power of the mascots, they manage to free their captive sisters. The members of ASIC fall by their hand as well, though they uncover a sinister plot to use their power to revive Arfoire. Making their way to the Gamindustri Graveyard for the last time, Nepgear's party defeats Arfoire, and the CPUs attempt to seal the entity forever.

Settings
Because of the game being in a new dimension to the first one, the four landmasses have undergone changes. Each area introduces new NPC's, and certain NPC's have moved landmasses from the first game.

Planeptune
The original hub world used in the first game, as well as Neptune's first location. The entire landmass contains more of a futuristic feel compared to the first game. Histoire, as its Oracle, has saved the landmass numerous times, and has become famous among the citizens because of it. Due to Nepgear's work, Planeptune has become the least affected of the four landmasses. Nepgear (Purple Sister), Compa, IF, Neptune (Purple Heart) and various NPC's reside here.

Lastation
A direct reference to the PlayStation series, due to the majority of the landmass's buildings being colored black. It is usually described as steampunk, and has become slightly more industrialized since the first game. Least affected by the influence of ASIC, due to preparations beforehand. Acts as a major trade center for the other landmasses. Uni (Black Sister), Nisa, Noire (Black Heart) and various NPC's reside here.

Lowee
A direct reference to the Wii, due to the majority of the landscape being colored white. Compared to the first Lowee, it seems more colorful. Highly threatened by the influence of ASIC. Houses various icons of the 2D era as well as previous CPU's of Lowee. Ram (White Sister), Rom (White Sister), Gust and Blanc (White Heart) reside here.

Leanbox
A direct reference to the Xbox, due to all the brown and bloom scenery. The buildings seem more simple, yet futuristic since the original Leanbox. They have employed a variety of countermeasures against ASIC, though it was only a temporary fix. Generally viewed as a military nation, and is a rival/trade partner of Lastation. Cave, 5pb., Vert (Green Heart) and various NPC's reside here.

Gamindustri Graveyard
This is an entirely new landmass created by Arfoire herself, due to her new powers. The landscape contains the ruins of notable artifacts in video game history, such as the Game Boy Advance. Not accessible through normal means. Three mysterious fairies, as well as ASIC (Arforie Syndicate of International Crime) reside here. This is also the location of the opening battle between the goddesses and Magic the Hard (CFW Magic in English version), though they are defeated, and the four goddesses and Nepgear are captured. However, three years later, Compa and IF help Nepgear escape.

Characters

This sequel marks the first appearance of the CPU's younger sisters, the CPU Candidates. The story focuses on the younger sisters of Neptune (Purple Heart), Noire (Black Heart), and Blanc (White Heart), which are the CPU Candidates on a quest to save the goddesses (which are the CPU Candidates' older sisters) after they are defeated and captured by Arfoire. Most existing characters will return, as well as new main characters and supporting characters. The new main characters have the task of rescuing the goddesses or CPU from the first game.

 Nepgear: Known as Purple Sister, is the younger sister of Neptune (Purple Heart). Her name is a reference to the Sega Game Gear.
 Uni: Known as Black Sister, is the younger sister of Noire (Black Heart). She is a reference to the Sony PlayStation Portable.
 Ram: Known as White Sister, is the younger one of Blanc's twin sisters (White Heart). Her name is a reference to Random Access Memory. She and her sister are references to the two screens of a Nintendo DS.
 Rom: Also known as White Sister, is the older one of Blanc's twin sisters (White Heart). Her name is a reference to Read Only Memory. She and her sister are references to the two screens of a Nintendo DS.

In addition to the original sisters, other characters that make return appearances include Compa, IF, 5pb,

Some of the new characters include:
Cave

Brand new NPC in mk2. She belongs to the Leanbox SMD (Special Missions Department), and is close friends with other Leanbox residents, such as 5pb. Self-conscious about herself, and has an inability to recognize faces. Representative of Cave Co., another video game company. In a recent announcement, she will be receiving a Battle Ticket to make her playable.

Falcom

New NPC representative of Nihon Falcom Corporation, a Japanese computer game company. An adventuress who travels Gamindustri and publishes books about her adventures under the alias A. Christin. She wields the sword Dragon Slayer, which is concealed in a violin case she carries on her back. Claims that she can't ignore evil. She also has a tendency to meddle with the affairs of others who cross her path. Along with Cave, a new upcoming Battle Ticket will make her playable.

Oracles
 Histoire (Histy): Appears in the first game; now she becomes the Oracle of Planeptune.
 Kei Jinguji (J.K.): The Oracle of Lastation.
 Mina Nishizawa: The Oracle of Lowee.
 Chika Hakozaki: The Oracle of Leanbox.

Appears in Mk2 
 Nisa

Nisa appears in the original Mk2. She joins the party to stop the nefarious deeds of ASIC. Representative of Nippon Ichi Software

Gust

Gust appears in the original Mk2. She joins the party after restoring Lowee's mascot. Representative of former video game company Gust

Appears in Re;Birth2 Sisters Generation 
Red

She is a young lesbian girl who constantly travels the world in search for "wifeys," eventually running into Nepgear and declaring her as first "wifey". Her name is directly derived from Red Entertainment. She takes the place of Nisa in Re;Birth2.
Broccoli

A little girl who has a sharp tongue and very intelligent. Her name is directly derived from Broccoli Co., Ltd. She takes the place of Gust in Re;Birth2.
Cyberconnect2

A girl who hails from Fukoka who joins the party in Lastation. Her name is derived from Cyberconnect2
MarvelousAQL

A busty kunoichi who joins the party in Lowee. Her name is derived from MarvelousAQL.
Tekken

A fighter who is also a masochist who joins the party in Leanbox. Her name is derived from the Tekken franchise.

Antagonists
Arfoire (the Deity of Sin)
The final boss, who is also the main antagonist in the first game of the series.

Four Felons
CFW Magic, CFW Judge, CFW Trick and CFW Brave respectively. They are members of the ASIC, whose only reason for existing is to revive Arfoire.

Linda (Underling)

Loyal soldier to ASIC, and serves under her boss, CFW Magic. No one ever really uses her real name. The official website refers to her as Underling. She willingly performs any mission handed to her, no matter how low. She repeatedly shows up to try to accomplish her goals and destroy the CPUs, though she is constantly defeated every time. She has been shown to make various allusions to games and otherwise.

Pirachu/

A talking mouse, and member of ASIC.

Hyperdimension Neptunia Re;Birth2
Hyperdimension Neptunia Re;Birth2: Sisters Generation is an enhanced portable version of the game for the PlayStation Vita developed by Felistella. Nearly all of the original game's premises, such as story, missions and dungeons, were kept intact, however there were major changes in the game's visuals, such as the improved frame rate performance, sharper visuals and the usage of 2D character artworks in the dialogue scenes, replacing the 3D character models present in the original game. Akin to the previous PS Vita game from the series, Hyperdimension Neptunia Re;Birth 1, this game also utilises the battle system from Hyperdimension Neptunia Victory in addition to a "remake system" which unlocks special modifications to the game.

Re;Birth 2 brings a new selection of playable characters. In addition to most of the original mk2 cast, the game also features the characters representing game developer companies introduced in Hyperdimension Neptunia Victory, in addition to Cave, 5pb, Red, and the four Oracles of each continent; both Gust and Nisa have been removed from the game, however. The game also features a totally reworked English script and voice acting.

Unlike the original, the ESRB rated the game with Teen.

Music
The opening theme is  performed by nao, the ending theme is GO→Love&Peace by Ayane, and an insert song is titled  by YuiKaori.

Reception

Hyperdimension Neptunia mk2

The original version received mixed reviews. It received an aggregated score of 53/100 on Metacritic based on 16 reviews.

Hyperdimension Neptunia Re;Birth 2: Sisters Generation

The PlayStation Vita rendition, Hyperdimension Neptunia Re;Birth2: Sisters Generation, was given a review score of 32/40 by Famitsu. During the first week of release in Japan, Re;Birth2 sold 26,845 physical retail copies.

In the West, it received mixed reviews. Aggregating review website Metacritic gave the PlayStation Vita version 67/100 based on 19 reviews, and GameRankings gave the Microsoft Windows version 58% based on 4 reviews.

In June 2015, the remake version was the second most purchased Steam-platform game amongst players from the Vatican City, as reported by real-time Steam trackers.

References

External links
Official website for the PS3 game
Official website for the PS3 game 
Official website for the PS Vita remake
Official website for the PS Vita remake 

2011 video games
Compile Heart games
Gust Corporation games
Hyperdimension Neptunia games
Multiplayer and single-player video games
Nippon Ichi Software games
PlayStation 3 games
PlayStation Vita games
Role-playing video games
Science fantasy video games
Sega video games
Video game sequels
Video games featuring female protagonists
Windows games
Video games with alternate endings
Video games developed in Japan
Felistella games